Schrödinger is a large lunar impact crater of the form traditionally called a walled plain and is named after Erwin Schrödinger. It is located near the south lunar pole on the far side of the Moon, and can only be viewed from orbit. 

The smaller crater Ganswindt is attached to the southwestern rim of Schrödinger, and intrudes slightly into the inner wall. Adjacent to the south is the crater Nefed'ev. Farther to the southwest is the crater Amundsen.

Schrödinger is perhaps the moon's best example of a peak-ring basin.  It possesses a wide outer rim that has been slightly rounded due to subsequent impacts. But the rim remains well-defined, and traces of terraces can be seen along the inner surface. The ejecta on the exterior forms an irregular outer rampart that extends for up to 100 kilometers.  Within the interior is a second ring approximately half the diameter of the outer rim. This forms a circular range of rugged mountains that surrounds the center, with the exception of a wide gap in the south. The remainder of the floor has been resurfaced by subsequent lava flows, producing a relatively flat surface particularly within the inner ring. The exception is an area of rough ground in the southeast part of the interior.

A complex of rilles has formed across the floor, forming multiple clefts particularly in the south. The floor has also been marked by subsequent impacts, leaving tiny craterlets scattered across the surface. There is no central peak at the midpoint of the interior.

There is a long, narrow valley leading directly away from Schrödinger to the northwest, designated Vallis Schrödinger. This formation begins some distance from the outer rim of the crater, at the edge of the ejecta that surrounds the perimeter. It extends to the rim of the crater Moulton. Another similar valley designated Vallis Planck radiates to the north, beginning near the crater Grotrian at the periphery of the  Schrödinger ejecta, and extending past Fechner.

The Schrödinger impact basin is one of a few locations on the Moon that show evidence of geologically recent volcanic activity. A geological study of the basin shows evidence of lava flows and eruptions from vents. There is also older volcanic material and material scattered because of impacts.  The volcanic vent is called Schrödinger G, and is thought to be Imbrian in age.

Satellite craters 

By convention these features are identified on lunar maps by placing the letter on the side of the crater midpoint that is closest to Schrödinger.

Popular culture

Schrödinger crater is the location of the Moon Nazi base, Schwarze Sonne, in the Finnish film Iron Sky.

References

 
 
 
 
 
 
 
 
 
 
 
 

 

Impact craters on the Moon